Florida Doesn't Suck is a split extended play by Floridian indie outfits, Fake Problems and You Blew It!.

Track listing

Critical reception 

The extended play was released before either band received much mainstream attention, so there are very few professional reviews on the EP. Tori Pope of Punknews.org gave the extended play three-and-half stars out of five. Pope praised Fake Problems for the reinvention of their sound, stating "their two songs here represent yet another step in their constant evolution." Pope was more critical of You Blew It!'s half of the EP, claiming that their song Batavia, NY is "a drowsy slow-burning song that builds to a climax that never come".

References 

2013 EPs
Split EPs
Fake Problems albums
You Blew It! EPs
Topshelf Records albums